The 1992 United States Cup (U.S. Cup) was a United States Soccer Federation (USSF) organized international football tournament which took place in May and June 1992. This was the inaugural U.S. Cup, a tournament which ran until 2000, except for the World Cup years of 1994 and 1998.

In this first U.S. Cup, the United States hosted Italy, Ireland and Portugal in a round robin tournament. The team with the highest number of points at the end of the tournament won the competition. The United States exceeded expectations by winning the first U.S. Cup.

United States vs Ireland

Summary
The United States defeated Ireland in the opening game. While the score of this game would suggest a United States dominance, the game was much closer than 3-1. The match was scoreless at halftime. Ireland scored first when Mick McCarthy headed in a cross from Steve Staunton in the 51st minute. The United States scored three minutes later when Marcelo Balboa scored from a set play. The United States scored again when Fernando Clavijo passed to Tab Ramos, who scored from 20 yards. Clavijo came on for Chris Henderson who went off injured after himself replacing Peter Vermes at half time. John Harkes scored the United States's third goal in the 87th minute.

Detail

May 31: Italy vs Portugal
In the second game, Italy and Portugal played to a scoreless draw. Both teams had players sent off, Roberto Donadoni (Italy) in the 84th minute and Leal (Portugal) in the 86th minute.

Italy: Walter Zenga, Moreno Mannini, Paolo Maldini, Luca Fusi (Galia 78’), Franco Baresi, Alessandro Costacurta, Roberto Baggio (Casiraghi 71’), Bianchi (Giuseppe Signori 85’), Donadoni, Vialli, Di Chiara (Lombardo 35’)

Portugal: Vítor Baía, J. Couto (António da Silva Samuel 39’), Paulo Madeira, Leal, João V. Pinto, Luís Figo (Filipe 87’), Rui Filipe, Peixe (Domingos 85’), Vítor Paneira (Jaime Magalhães 46’), Jorge Cadete (Semedo 86’), João D. Pinto

June 3: USA vs Portugal
The United States won a 1-0 victory over Portugal in front of only 10,402 fans at Chicago's Soldier Field. In the 35th minute, Roy Wegerle, breaking down the middle, took a long pass from Bruce Murray. Wegerle ran through the Portuguese defense and faced the Portuguese keeper, Adelino Barros. Barros rushed out to cut the angle, but Wegerle shifted the ball to his left foot and shot into the empty net.

United States: Tony Meola, Marcelo Balboa, John Doyle, Thomas Dooley, Paul Caligiuri (Fernando Clavijo 61’), Brian Quinn, Tab Ramos, Bruce Murray (Chris Henderson 46’), John Harkes, (Janusz Michallik 78’), Hugo Perez (Earnie Stewart 68’), Roy Wegerle

Portugal: Adelino Barros, J. Couto, Torres (Filipe 34’), Paulo Madeira, João V. Pinto, Semedo, Magalhães (Cadete 46’), Luís Figo (Sousa 81’), Peixe, João D. Pinto (Paneira 46’), Domingos (Jorge Cadete 77’)

June 4: Italy vs Ireland
Italy scored twice, once from normal play and the second from a penalty kick. Ireland's goalkeeper, Packie Bonner, was sent off in the 64th minute.

Italy: Walter Zenga, Franco Baresi (Ferri 77’), Paolo Maldini, Alessandro Costacurta, Bianchi (Lombardo 73’), Galia, Fusi (Venturin 46’), Carboni (Mannini 51’), Giuseppe Signori, Mancini (Vialli 80’), Casiraghi

Ireland: Bonner, Steve Staunton, O.Leary, McCarthy (McLoughlin 46’), Irwin (Peyton 66’), Houghton, Townsend, McGrath, McGoldrick (Phelan 80’), Niall Quinn (Tommy Coyne 72’), Aldridge (Kelly 78’)

June 6: USA vs Italy
Roberto Baggio scored the first goal for Italy in the second minute. However, John Harkes of the United States scored his second goal of the tournament with a 13-yard shot in the 23rd minute. The game ended 1-1, and the United States won its first U.S. Cup.

United States: Tony Meola, Marcelo Balboa, Thomas Dooley, John Doyle, Paul Caligiuri, Brian Quinn, Tab Ramos (Janusz Michallik 86’), Bruce Murray (Fernando Clavijo 46’), John Harkes, Hugo Pérez (Earnie Stewart 75’), Roy Wegerle

Italy: Luca Marchegiani, Franco Baresi, Paolo Maldini, Giuseppe Mannini, Roberto Galia
(Alberto Di Chiara 65'), Alessandro Bianchi, Riccardo Ferri (Luca Fusi 46'), Roberto
Donadoni, Giuseppe Signori, Pierluigi Casiraghi, Roberto Baggio (Gianluca Vialli
74')

June 7: Ireland vs Portugal
Irish player Steven Staunton scored directly from a corner kick. Tommy Coyne scored a second Irish goal in the 89th minute.

Ireland: Peyton, Steve Staunton, McCarthy, O. Leary, Morris, Houghton, McLoughlin, McGrath, Phelan (McGoldrick 89’), Kelly (Tommy Coyne 58’), Niall Quinn (Aldridge 87’)

Portugal: Vítor Baía, Leal (Magalhães 71’), J. Couto (João D. Pinto 46’), Samuel, Fernando Couto, João V. Pinto, Semedo (Paulo Sousa 75’), Rui Filipe, Vítor Paneira (Filipe 46’), Luís Figo (Domingos 46’), Jorge Cadete

Champion

Scorers
Two Goals
 John Harkes

One Goal
 Roberto Baggio
 Alessandro Costacurta
 Giuseppe Signori
 Marcelo Balboa
 Tab Ramos
 Roy Wegerle
 Tommy Coyne
 Mick McCarthy
 Steve Staunton

Final rankings

References

External links
1992 U.S. Cup Statistics at RSSSF.com

1992
1991–92 in Portuguese football
1992 in American soccer
1991–92 in Republic of Ireland association football
1991–92 in Italian football
May 1992 sports events in the United States
June 1992 sports events in the United States